Yevgeny Tretnikov (Russian: Евгений Третников; 1919–1992) was a Russian rower who represented the Soviet Union. He competed at the 1952 Summer Olympics in Helsinki with the men's coxed four where they were eliminated in the semi-final repêchage.

References

1919 births
1992 deaths
Soviet male rowers
Olympic rowers of the Soviet Union
Rowers at the 1952 Summer Olympics